Martin William Pike (12 July 1920 – 10 January 1997) was a British athlete who competed in the 1948 Summer Olympics. He was born in Tendring, Essex. He was part of the winning British 4×400 metres relay team at the 1950 European Athletics Championships.

References

1920 births
1997 deaths
People from Tendring (district)
English male sprinters
Olympic athletes of Great Britain
Athletes (track and field) at the 1948 Summer Olympics
European Athletics Championships medalists